is a Japanese television drama series based on the mystery novel by Jun Ikeido. The novel was previously adapted for NHK Radio 1 in 2014. It premiered on Fuji TV from 13 April 2015 on Mondays at 21:00. On average, it received a viewership rating of 12.5%, and the final episode recorded the highest rating of 15.0%.

Masaki Aiba, who is a member of the Japanese idol group Arashi played the lead role for the first time in getsuku drama. Kasumi Arimura and Erika Sawajiri also appeared in a supporting role.

Cast
 Masaki Aiba as Kenta Kurata
 Erika Sawajiri as Asuka Kandori, a reporter
 Kasumi Arimura as Nana Kurata, Kenta's sister
 Kaho Minami as Keiko Kurata, Kenta and Nana's mother
 Akira Terao as Taichi Kurata, Kenta and Nana's father
 Sayaka Yamaguchi as Setsuko Nishizawa
 Naoto Takenaka as Hiroki Mase
 Junji Takada as Michiharu Yagi
 Rika Adachi as Marie Hobara

Episodes

References

External links
  
 

Japanese drama television series
2015 Japanese television series debuts
2015 Japanese television series endings
Fuji TV dramas
Television shows based on Japanese novels
Television shows set in Yokohama